Richard Falkner was a state legislator in North Carolina. He served in the North Carolina House of Representatives for two terms from 1868 to 1871.

From 1868 to 1871 he served with William Cawthorn in the North Carolina House representing Warren County, North Carolina.

See also
African-American officeholders during and following the Reconstruction era

References

Year of birth missing
Year of death missing
Members of the North Carolina House of Representatives
19th-century American politicians